The Basketball League (TBL), formerly North America Premier Basketball (NAPB), is a professional basketball organization. The league began operating in North America in 2018 with eight teams, and expanded to over 44 teams as of 2022. 

The Basketball League is a professional basketball league providing player salaries from $500 to $6,500 per month, while teams operate on a budget of $125,000 to $250,000 per season.

History 
On July 7, 2017, Sev Hrywnak and Dave Magley announced the formation of a new professional basketball league. Magley previously served as commissioner for the National Basketball League of Canada (NBLC). Hrywnak was the owner of the Rochester Razorsharks. Teams are based throughout the United States and Western Canada. Over the course of two years, the league administration located cities that formerly hosted basketball teams in the defunct Continental Basketball Association, the Premier Basketball League, defunct NBA teams and other potential sports markets. The purpose of the league is to provide opportunities for community involvement particularly schools from the elementary to high school levels. Programs include players reading to younger children, hosting basketball camps for teens, and speaking in school-wide assemblies about substance abuse and staying in school.

The league launched its inaugural 2018 season with eight teams: the Albany Patroons, Kansas City Tornados, Kentucky Thoroughbreds, Nevada Desert Dogs, Ohio Cardinals, Rochester Razorsharks, Vancouver Knights, and the Yakima SunKings. The Ohio Cardinals were replaced mid-season by the Ohio Bootleggers, a team operated by the former ownership of the Vancouver Knights.

On February 25, 2018, Dave Magley announced that there were four more approved franchises in Bellevue, Washington, Raleigh, North Carolina, Tampa, Florida, and San Diego, California, with the goal of 16 total well-funded teams, for a 2019 season.

After the first NAPB season, Magley acquired the league as sole owner, moved the headquarters to Indiana, and named Evelyn Magley—his wife—as the new CEO. On July 14, the league was re-branded as The Basketball League (TBL). Paul Mokeski, head coach and general manager of the Nevada Desert Dogs during the inaugural season, was then named commissioner of the league for the 2019 season. During the league changes, the Ohio Bootleggers, Rochester Razorsharks, and Vancouver Knights folded while the Bellevue team never came to fruition. The league then added the existing teams, the Jamestown Jackals and New York Court Kings, in addition to the three previously announced expansion teams, the Raleigh Firebirds, San Diego Waves, and Tampa Bay Titans. Three teams also slightly re-branded with the Kansas City Tornadoes, Mesquite Desert Dogs, and Owensboro Thoroughbreds. The 2019 season commenced with ten teams.

During the second season, there were many canceled and rescheduled games. The league cut its season short, with the New York Court Kings and Kansas City Tornadoes either folding or ceasing operations for the season.

Prior to the third season, the league added the Columbus Condors, Dayton Flight, Dallas Skyline, Gulf Coast Lions, Indy Express, Lewisville Yellow Jackets, and the Tri-State Admirals as expansion teams. The San Diego Waves were replaced by expansion San Diego Armada while the Waves were being relocated, but neither team would make the 2020 schedule. Due to the lack of other western teams, the Yakima SunKings and the Mesquite Desert Dogs suspended operations. The third season started in January 2020, but on March 11, 2020, the league announced the season would end prematurely due to the COVID-19 pandemic and have a four-team playoff on March 18 through 22. However, the tournament was also cancelled as most events throughout the country were closed to prevent the spread of the virus.

The league then proceeded to announce several new teams for the 2021 season, expanding from 12 teams in the curtailed 2020 season to 35 teams by January 11, 2021. Several of the added teams came from the semi-professional American Basketball Association. In March, several teams began opting out of the season due to the ongoing pandemic restrictions.

For the 2021–22 season, the National Basketball League of Canada (NBLC) announced that they had agreed to inter-league series play with several teams from The Basketball League. The games played between the teams from the two leagues are included in their respective regular season standings for each league.

Teams

Upcoming teams

Former teams

Seasons

 Shortened season due to the COVID-19 pandemic, The Indy Express had the best overall record at the time of cancellation.

Notes

References

External links
TBL website

 
Sports leagues established in 2018
Basketball leagues in the United States
2018 establishments in North America
Basketball leagues in Canada